Karoo Hoogland is an administrative area in the Namakwa District of Northern Cape in South Africa.

Hoogland an Afrikaans word meaning "highland" and Karoo is a Khoi word meaning "hard" or "dry". The name reflects the area which has dry, arid and desert-like conditions.

The municipality incorporates the towns of Williston, Fraserburg and Sutherland. Although the towns are separated by more than 100 km by road, they share many administrative tasks.

Karoo Hoogland elected the first (and so far only) mayor from COPE, Jan Julies, in 2011, as a COPE-DA coalition took control of the council after the election of 18 May 2011. This lasted until the 2016 elections.

Main places
The 2011 census divided the municipality into the following main places:

Politics

The municipal council consists of eleven members elected by mixed-member proportional representation. Six councillors are elected by first-past-the-post voting in six wards, while the remaining five are chosen from party lists so that the total number of party representatives is proportional to the number of votes received. In the election of 1 November 2021 no party obtained a majority of seats on the council. The following table shows the results of the election.

On 8 December 2022 the PA/ANC coalition collapsed during a no confidence motion brought by the DA. Consequently the PA mayor Anthony Mietas was replaced by the DA’s Johan van der Colff.

References

External links
 Official website

Local municipalities of the Namakwa District Municipality